The Redmi 10C is an Android-based smartphone as part of the Redmi series, a sub-brand of Xiaomi Inc. This phone was announced on March 21, 2022, and is marketed as lite version of Redmi 10 but in some specifications it is better than base model. In India Redmi 10C was introdused as Redmi 10 (not to be confused with global Redmi 10 which solds in India as Redmi 10 Prime) with bigger battery. Also there is the Redmi 10 Power which have more memory capacity than Indian Redmi 10 and different back.

Design 

The front is made of Gorilla Glass 3. The back is made of plastic with a wavy texture in Redmi 10C and Indian Redmi 10, and with a leather texture in Redmi 10 Power.

The design of smartphones is similar to realme narzo 50A with a camera unit merged with a fingerprint sensor.

On the bottom side, there are USB-C ports, a speaker, and a microphone. On the top side, there is a 3.5mm audio jack. On the left side there is dual SIM tray with microSD slot. On the right side there are a volume rocker and a power button.

Redmi 10C sells in 3 colours: Graphite Gray, Ocean Blue and Mint Green.

Redmi 10 in India sells in 3 colors: Midnight Black (gray), Pacific Blue, and Caribbean Green.

Redmi 10 Power sells in 3 colors: Power Black and Sporty Orange.

Specifications

Hardware

Platform 
Smartphones have, like Redmi Note 11, Qualcomm Snapdragon 680 4G with Adreno 610.

Battery 
Redmi 10C has a non-removable battery with a capacity of 5000 mAh, when Indian Redmi 10 and Redmi 10 Power have a battery with a capacity of 6000 mAh. All models have 18 W fast charging support but in-box charger has 10W power.

Camera 
The rear and front cameras can record video in 1080p@30fps.

Display 
Phones have 6.71" IPS LCD display with HD+ (1650 × 720; ~269 ppi) image resolution and waterdrop notch.

Memory 
Redmi 10C solds with 3/64, 4/64 or 4/128 GB, Indian Redmi 10 ― 4/64 and 4/128 GB, and Redmi 10 Power ― 8/128 GB.

All models have LPDDR4X type of RAM and type of storage UFS 2.2 which could be extended by microSD to 1 TB.

Software 
Initially, smartphones were released with MIUI 13 custom skin based on Android 11. Later they were updated to Android 12.

References

External links 
 
 
 

Android (operating system) devices
Phablets
10C
Mobile phones introduced in 2022
Mobile phones with multiple rear cameras